Ramprasadi (Bengali: রামপ্রসাদী) is the songs composed by eighteenth century Bengali saint-poet Ramprasad Sen. They are usually addressed to Hindu goddess Kali and written in Bengali language.

Influence 

Ramprasad Sen was the first shakta poet to address Kali with such as intimate devotion and to sing of her as a tender loving mother or even as a little girl. He is credited with creating a new compositional form that combined the Bengali folk style of Baul music with classical melodies and kirtan. After him, a school of shakta poets continued the Kali-bhakti tradition. Krishna Chandra Roy, Siraj ud-Daulah, Rabindranath Tagore, Kazi Nazrul Islam were immensely inspired by the songs of Ramprasad. Many of his songs were sung by famous Shyama sangeet singers like Dhananjay Bhattacharya, Pannalal Bhattacharya and Anup Ghoshal.

Incomplete list of songs 
 De maa amay tabildari
 Abhay pade pran sanpechi
 Mon re krishi kaaj jana na
 Mon keno mayer charanchara
 Dakre mon kali bole
 Aamar antore anandamayee
 Abhay charan sab lotale
 Apar sangsar nahi parapar
 Annapurnar dhanya kashi
 Asakale jaba kotha
 Aamar kapal go tara
 Ami eto doshi kishe
 Emon din ki hobe maa tara
 Patitapabani tara
 Maa aamar baro bhay hoyeche
 Naam bhrama bateshwar
 kemon kare charaye jaba
 Rasane, kali nam ratare
 Maa aamar khelan halo
 Akalanka shashimukhi, sudhapane sada sukhi
 Aami tei tarutale base
 Aaj subhanishi pohailo tomar
 Amay ki dhon dibi tor ki dhon ache
 Amay choyo naa re shamon aamar jat giyache
 Aamar sanad dheke jare
 Ami oi khede khed kori
 Ar kaaj ki aamar kashi?
 Chi mon tui bisoybhola
 Ar bholale bhulba naa go
 Kemon kare tarabe tara
 Kaligun geye bagal bajaye
 Chi-chi monbhramara dili baji

See also 
 Music of Bengal
 Music of West Bengal

References

External links 

 Ramprasadi - gaana.com

Music of Bengal
Bengali music
Indian music
Kirtan